Wusha is a town of Xingyi, Guizhou, China. , it administers Wusha Residential Community and the following eight villages:
Niubangzi Village
Nagu Village
Yaoshang Village
Moshe Village
Mojiao Village
Puti Village
Daxingzhai Village
Chajiang Village

References

Township-level divisions of Guizhou
Xingyi, Guizhou